{{DISPLAYTITLE:C4H2O4}}
The molecular formula C4H2O4 (molar mass: 114.06 g/mol, exact mass: 113.9953 u) may refer to:

 Acetylenedicarboxylic acid, or butynediodic acid
 Squaric acid, or quadratic acid

Molecular formulas